A number of steamships were named Vindeggen, including –

, a cargo ship in service 1915–16
, a cargo ship in service 1917–18
, a cargo ship in service 1921–31
, a cargo ship in service 1946–48

See also
, as cargo ship in service 1948–52

Ship names